Zingiberoideae is a subfamily of plants in the family Zingiberaceae.

Tribes & genera

Tribe Globbeae
 Globba
 Mantisia
 Gagnepainia
 Hemiorchis

Tribe Zingibereae

 Boesenbergia
 Camptandra
 Caulokaempferia
 Cautleya
 Curcuma
 Curcumorpha
 Haniffia
 Haplochorema
 Hedychium
 Hitchenia
 Kaempferia
 Nanochilus
 Paracautleya
 Parakaempferia
 Pommereschea
 Rhynchanthus
 Roscoea
 Scaphochlamys
 Stadiochilus
 Stahlianthus
 Zingiber

incertae sedis
 Caulokaempferia

References

External links
 
 

 
Zingiberaceae
Monocot subfamilies